Noor Tagouri (born November 27, 1993) is an American journalist, activist, motivational speaker and producer of the documentary series on the mistreatment of people with mental disabilities titled The Trouble They've Seen: The Forest Haven Story, and of a podcast-series on sex trafficking in the U.S. titled Sold in America: Inside Our Nation's Sex Trade. In 2016, she became the first Hijab wearing Muslim woman to appear (fully clothed) in an issue of Playboy magazine.

Education
Tagouri attended Prince George's Community College from 2010-2011. She also holds a Bachelor of Arts (BA) degree from the University of Maryland, with a major in broadcast journalism and a minor in international development and conflict management.

Career
Tagouri started her broadcasting career in June 2012 working as an intern with the CBS Radio. After the death of Freddie Grey in 2015, a local Maryland TV station sent her to cover protests in Baltimore. She also worked for CTV News as a reporter for almost 2 years. In June 2016, she joined Newsy, an online video news site based in Washington, D.C., as an anchor and producer. She initiated a social media campaign in December 2012 called LetNoorShine.

In 2019, Tagouri partnered with Pulse Films to create a new documentary show, :In America With Noor that will explore "a wide range of controversial subjects and how they affect daily American life and culture."

Her experiences led her to launch her own production company, At Your Service.

Podcasts
Tagouri's podcast Sold in America gave a window into the sex trade industry in the United States. It was released on Facebook Watch, Amazon, and Hulu. The podcast has been downloaded more than 1.5 million times. 

In 2020, she launched Podcast Noor.

Social Impact Initiatives
In 2018, Noor along with her mother, Salwa Tagouri, launched the ISeeYou foundation to amplify the voices of the unheard and unseen.

Personal life 
In 2016, Tagouri became engaged to Adam Khafif. The couple were married on 20 May 2017 in Miami.

References

Living people
1993 births
University System of Maryland alumni
American Muslims
People from West Virginia
American people of Libyan descent